Lothar Firmans (1896–1964) was a German stage and film actor.

Selected filmography
 Quax the Crash Pilot (1941)
 Front Theatre (1942)
 Aufruhr der Herzen (1944)
 Quax in Africa (1947)
 Marriage in the Shadows (1947)
 Girls in Gingham (1949)
 Hoegler's Mission (1950)
 Anna Susanna (1953)

References

Bibliography
 Giesen, Rolf. Nazi Propaganda Films: A History and Filmography. McFarland & Company, 2003.

External links

1896 births
1964 deaths
German male stage actors
German male film actors